Mesciniadia is a genus of snout moths. It was described by George Hampson in 1901.

Species
 Mesciniadia aenicta
 Mesciniadia infractalis (Walker, 1864)
 Mesciniadia otoptila

References

Phycitini
Pyralidae genera
Taxa named by George Hampson